Hypotia mineti is a species of snout moth in the genus Hypotia. It was described by Patrice J.A. Leraut in 2004 and is known from Madagascar.

References

Moths described in 2004
Hypotiini